Veronique Zanetti (born 1959) is a German professor of Political Philosophy at Faculty of History, Philosophy, and Theology, Bielefeld University.

Academia
The focus of Zanetti's work is in the fields of ethics, philosophy of international relations, and philosophy of law. Issues such as global justice, national and international security, development of normative regulations, new forms of war, and internationally organized crime are at the center of her current research.

Zanetti is a member of the academic advisory board of the series “Studies in Global Justice“. University of Utah, Salt Lake City: Springer (since 2004) and has been a member of the Federal Ethics Committee on Non-Human Biotechnology since 2003.

Research
Organizing a study group at the Center for Interdisciplinary Research (Zentrum für interdisziplinäre Forschung, ZIF) on the issue of collective responsibility and international relations (since 2007)

Selected publications
2009. Vom Recht auf Selbstverteidigung zum Recht auf Hilfe. Wie wird das Recht auf humanitäre Intervention genau begründet? [From the right of self-defense to the right to aid. How exactly is the right of humanitarian intervention justified?]. In Menschenrechte in die Zukunft denken, ed. H. J. Sandkühler. 101–114, Paris.
2009. Völkermord und die kollektive Behandlung von Individuen [Genocide and the collective actions of individuals]. In Handeln mit Bedeutung und Handeln mit Gewalt, eds. C. Fehige, C. Lumer, and U. Wessels, 307–323 Paderborn: mentis.
2008. L´intervention humanitaire. Droits des individus, devoirs des États. Geneva: Labor et Fides.
2007. Hilfspflicht angesichts globaler Armut? Rawls’ Vertragstheorie zwischen Völkern [Duty to aid in view of global poverty? Rwals’ social contract theory between nations]. In Weltarmut und Ethik, eds. B. Bleisch and P. Schaber, 317–337. Paderborn: mentis
2007. Women, War and International Law. In Civilian Immunity in War, ed. I. Primoratz, 217–238. Oxford: Oxford University Press.
2007. Krieg ist Frieden? Zum Reformbedarf des Systems kollektiver Sicherheit [War is peace? On the need to reform the system of collective security]. In Der gerechte Friede zwischen Pazifismus und gerechtem Krieg, eds. J.-D. Strub and S. Grotefeld, 271–284. Stuttgart: Kohlhammer.
2005. Wie stark soll Europa sein? Europas Sicherheit angesichts neuer Typen bewaffneter Konflikte [How strong shall Europe be? Europe's security in view of new types of armed conflict]. In Legitimationsgrundlagen in der Europäischen Union, eds. F. Cheneval, S. Dänzer, and A. Utzinger. Münster, Hamburg, London: LitVerlag.
2005. Egalitarian Global Distributive Justice or Minimal Standard? Pogge's Position. In Real World Justice: Grounds, Principals, Human Rights, and Social Institutions, eds. A. Follesdal and T. Pogge, 199–214. Dordrecht: Springer.
2004. Ist der gemäßigte Nationalismus moralisch vertretbar? [Is moderate nationalism morally justifiable?]. In Ideologien in der Weltpolitik, ed. K.-G. Giesen, 189–210. Wiesbaden: Verlag für Sozialwissenschaften.
1998. Ethik des Interventionsrechts [Ethics of the right of intervention]. In Politische Philosophie der internationalen Beziehungen, eds. C. Chwaszcza and W. Kersting, 297–324. Frankfurt a. M.: Suhrkamp Verlag.

References

External links
University page

1959 births
Academic staff of Bielefeld University
German social scientists
Living people
Political philosophers
German women academics